Sage Hill School is an independent co-educational college preparatory school for day students in grades 9-12, and is located in Newport Coast, California. The school first opened in September 2000 with a freshman and sophomore class of 120 students.

 Average class size is 14 students
 Offers more than 30 AP, accelerated and post-AP classes
 Student to College Counselor ratio is 34:1
 21 interscholastic sports totaling 41 teams at all levels of competition
 30,000-square-foot Studio features a Black Box Theater
 The Lisa Argyros & Family Science Center houses teaching and learning space for biology, chemistry and physics as well as interdisciplinary study of science and long-term research.
 Accredited by the Western Association of Schools and Colleges since 2003. Sage Hill is also accredited by the California Association of Independent Schools (CAIS).

References

External links 
Sage Hill School

Educational institutions established in 2000
High schools in Orange County, California
Private high schools in California
Preparatory schools in California
2000 establishments in California